John Calvin Matthews (August 9, 1841 – September 25, 1927) was a Union Army soldier in the American Civil War and a recipient of the United States military's highest decoration, the Medal of Honor, for his actions at the April 19, 1865 Third Battle of Petersburg, Virginia.

Biography

Matthews joined as a Private in Company A, 135th Pennsylvania (Nine Month) Volunteer Infantry on August 1, 1862, at age sixteen. He sered on provost duty in Washington DC until February 1863 when the regiment joined the 1st Brigade, 3rd Division, I Corps, Army of the Potomac at Falmouth, Virginia. Wearing the blue circle of the 3rd Division of Reynold's I Corps, the regiment took part in the Chancellorsville Campaign. On May 24, 1863, the regiment mustered out of Federal service, and Matthews returned home to Westmoreland County as a veteran at seventeen-years-old. After eight months at home, almost six weeks shy of his eighteenth birthday, he reenlisted as a Corporal in Company A, 61st Pennsylvania Volunteer Infantry for a three-year term on 13 Febry 1864. Now wearing the white Greek Cross of the 2nd Division of Sedgwick's VI Corps, he served in the 61st until the end of the war when he mustered out as a sergeant on June 28, 1865. He was nineteen-years-old.

His service with the 61st led him to participate in the Overland Campaign, the Siege of Petersburg, Sheridan's Shanandoah Valley Campaign, and the Appommattox Campaign. He was wounded twice. The first was at the Battle of Cedar Craak dring Sheridan's Valley Campaignm. The second time was at the Breakthrough at Petersburg for which he was awarded the Medal of Honor. Carrying the state flag in thecolor guard, he was in the vanguard of the 61st as it led the VI Corps attack on 2 April 1865. At the first volley from the Rebel lines, the regimental Color Sergeant fell wounded. Matthews grabbed the regimental colors and carried both. The defenders' fire stalled the attack, and the regiment fell back behind some breastworks forward of their lines. MAJ Robert L. Orr took the state flag from Matthews and began yelling and wavit to rally the attack. Matthews joined him and the two led the renewed advance into the Confederate positions that they captured. Matthews later wrote that "I had the honor to pick up a flag, carry it off the field, and, a few moments later, to plant it on the enemy's works for which service my colonel promoted me on the field to color-sergeant, and recommended me for a medal." He was one of five members of the 61st that earned the medal for their actions that day. The resultant victory combined with Sheridan's victory at Five Forks and Miles' victory at Sutherland's Station were breakthroughs that forced the evacuation of Petersburg and the Rebel retreat that ended with the surrender at Appomattox Court House.

After the war, Matthews returned to Pennsylvania still a teenager. That year, 1865, he married Asenath Work (1846-1942). They had four children, three of whom predeceased him: Albert Orr Matthews (1871–1891) (note that his first son's middle name was the last of his commander and comrade, Robert L. Orr.), Jesse Florence Matthews (1877–1887), and Margaret Belle Matthews McNamee (1881–1919). His Medal was awarded to him on February 13, 1891. He remained married to Asenath until his death in Akron, OH, at age 88 on 1934. He was survived by his wife, son Norman S. Matthews (1879–1973), and grandson through his daughter Margaret, Charles L McNamee (1906–1983). He was buried in his family plot with three of his children at Homewood Cemetery in Pittsburgh.

Medal of Honor citation
Matthews' official Medal of Honor citation reads:
The President of the United States of America, in the name of Congress, takes pleasure in presenting the Medal of Honor to Corporal John C. Matthews, United States Army, for extraordinary heroism on 2 April 1865, while serving with Company A, 61st Pennsylvania Infantry, in action at Petersburg, Virginia. Corporal Matthews voluntarily took the colors, whose bearer had been disabled, and, although himself severely wounded, carried the same until the enemy's works were taken.

See also

 List of American Civil War Medal of Honor recipients
 61st Pennsylvania Infantry Regiment
 Third Battle of Petersburg

Notes/references

Bibliography

External links
 Pennsylvania Volunteers, PA Civil War Medal of Honor Recipients, Westmoreland County

1841 births
1927 deaths
People from Philadelphia
Union Army soldiers
United States Army Medal of Honor recipients
People of Pennsylvania in the American Civil War
American Civil War recipients of the Medal of Honor